The Hispaniolan yellow-mottled frog or painted robber frog (Eleutherodactylus pictissimus) is a species of frog in the family Eleutherodactylidae endemic to Hispaniola and found in both the Dominican Republic and Haiti. Its natural habitats are dry scrub forest, mesic broadleaf forest, and secondary forest. It is a terrestrial frog that lays its eggs on the ground. It is threatened by habitat loss.

References

pictissimus
Endemic fauna of Hispaniola
Amphibians of the Dominican Republic
Amphibians of Haiti
Amphibians described in 1935
Taxonomy articles created by Polbot